Extreme Makeover: Home Edition Philippines was a Philippine reality series based on the American series, Extreme Makeover: Home Edition.

The Philippine television network TV5 was the first in Asia to acquire the rights to produce its own version of the American reality series.

A special one week preview of the show, entitled Extreme Makeover: Home Edition Philippines The Road to Make Over began airing on April 9, 2012 before its premiere on Sunday, April 15, 2012. The first season ended on June 17, 2012 having a total of 10 episodes in the entire season.

Road to the Makeover is always "Rated PG", However the main edition of the series is "Rated G". the difference that is depends on the episode. It aired every Sunday 8:30 PM (UTC+8). It differs from the American version, having a deadline of more than 7 days.

Overview
Each episode features a family that has faced some sort of recent or ongoing hardship such as a natural disaster, has a bad house or a family member with a life-threatening illness, in need of new hope. The show's producers collaborate with a local construction contractor, which then collaborates with various companies in the building trades for a makeover of the family's home. This includes interior, exterior and landscaping, performed in several days while the family is on vacation (paid for by the show's producers) and documented in the episode. If the house is beyond repair, they replace it entirely. The show's producers and crew film set and perform the makeover but do not pay for it. The materials and labor are donated. Many skilled and unskilled volunteers assist in the rapid construction of the house.

Extreme Makeover Team

Episodes

Awards and nominations

See also
 List of programs broadcast by TV5

References

External links
 

Philippine reality television series
2012 Philippine television series debuts
2012 Philippine television series endings
Extreme Makeover: Home Edition
Philippine television series based on American television series
TV5 (Philippine TV network) original programming
Home renovation television series
Makeover reality television series
Television series about families
Television series by Endemol
Filipino-language television shows